The Defense Superior Service Medal (DSSM) is a military decoration of the United States Department of Defense, which is presented to United States Armed Forces service members who perform superior meritorious service in a position of significant responsibility.

The decoration is most often presented to general and flag officers, followed by a lesser number of Army, Marine Corps, Air Force, and Space Force colonels and Navy and Coast Guard captains. It is analogous and senior to the Legion of Merit, albeit awarded for service in a joint duty capacity.

Criteria
The Defense Superior Service Medal is the United States Department of Defense's second-highest non-combat related military award and it is the second-highest joint service decoration. The Defense Superior Service Medal is awarded by the Secretary of Defense to members of the United States Armed Forces who have rendered superior meritorious service while serving in a position of great responsibility.  This service must be as part of a joint activity.  The award is generally for a period of time exceeding 12 months and encompassing an entire joint assignment.  Service members assigned to or attached to a Joint Task Force as individuals, not members of a specific military service's unit, can be eligible for the DSSM.  The DSSM has also been awarded to a small cohort of U.S. military officers serving as astronauts for service leading up to and during Space Shuttle missions carrying classified and unclassified Department of Defense payloads.  In these cases, the 12 month time period was considered to include the training period prior to that actual space flight, said training which typically exceeded a year in duration.

Members of service-specific units are eligible for awards of personal decorations from their parent service.  The Defense Superior Service Medal is specifically intended to recognize exceptionally superior service, and to honor an individual's accomplishments over a sustained period.  Joint or Department of Defense awards, including the Defense Superior Service Medal, may be awarded posthumously.

Appearance
At the time of creation of the Defense Superior Service Medal it was decided that it would be obtained at the lowest possible cost and with as little involvement as possible.  For these reasons, and because it would rank just below the Defense Distinguished Service Medal for similar service, it was decided to use the same design as the Defense Distinguished Service Medal.  The difference is that it is finished in silver rather than gold and the inscriptions on the reverse of the medal are appropriately modified.

The medal is made of a silver-colored metal with blue enamel, 1 7/8 inches (4.76 cm) in height overall.  The obverse depicts a silver American eagle superimposed over a medium blue pentagon.  The eagle has outstretched wings, charged on its breast is the shield of the United States.  In its talons are three crossed arrows in silver.  The tips of the wings cover a surrounding arc of silver five-pointed stars encircling the top and sides of the pentagon, while the bottom is surrounded by a silver wreath encircling the base composed of a laurel branch on the left and an olive branch on the right.

The reverse is plain except for the inscription at the top, For Superior Service.  Below in the pentagon is the inscription From The Secretary of Defense To.

The medal is suspended from a ribbon 1 3/8 inch (3.49 cm) in width composed of the following vertical stripes: Golden Yellow 3/16 inch (.48 cm), Bluebird 1/4 inch (.64 cm), White 3/16 inch (.48 cm), Scarlet 1/8 inch (.32 cm), White 3/16 inch (.48 cm), Bluebird 1/4 inch (.64 cm) Golden Yellow 3/16 inch (.48 cm).

Subsequent awards of the Defense Superior Service Medal are denoted by oak leaf clusters worn on the suspension and service ribbons of the medal.

Notable recipients

References

Awards and decorations of the United States Department of Defense
Awards established in 1976
1976 establishments in the United States